Rainer Michael Müller (born 9 December 1964) is a German politician of the Social Democratic Party (SPD) who served as Governing Mayor of Berlin from 2014 to 2021  as a member of the German Bundestag since the 2021 elections, representing the Berlin-Charlottenburg-Wilmersdorf district.

 
He was also President of the Bundesrat from November 2017 until October 2018, which made him deputy to the President of Germany.

Political career

State politics
Müller was elected to the Berlin House of Representatives in 1996 and has been a member ever since. On 16 June 2001, he took over leadership of the SPD Group in the House of Representatives from Klaus Wowereit who had been elected Governing Mayor of Berlin. After the resignation of Peter Strieder in April 2004, Müller ran for the Berlin SPD State Party Leadership and won, remaining the Leader of Berlin SPD until he lost his re-election bid against Jan Stöß in June 2012.

Following the 2011 state elections in Berlin, Müller was senator for urban development and the environment from 1 December 2011 to 11 December 2014. One of his most extensive projects, which planned to build business space and apartments on the grounds of the former Tempelhof Airport, was rejected in 2014 by a clear majority of Berlin citizens in a referendum.

Mayor of Berlin, 2014–2021

In December 2014, Müller took over in midterm from the incumbent Klaus Wowereit, Berlin's longest-serving mayor since reunification in 1990, who presided over the city's emergence as a popular tourist destination and center for high-tech start-ups but stepped down after his popularity suffered from the debacle around the Berlin Brandenburg Airport.

Müller had previously made a surprise entry into the race to succeed Wowereit and defeated two candidates initially seen as the most likely successors. Shortly before the election, Müller ran for the Leadership of the Social Democratic Party in Berlin a second time, and won. In the 2016 Berlin Election, he led the party to victory, albeit not without some losses. After the election, Müller ended the grand coalition with the Christian Democratic Union and formed a new government with the Green Party and the left-wing Die Linke.

As one of the state's representatives at the Bundesrat, Müller served on the Committee on Foreign Affairs, the Committee on European Affairs and the Committee on Cultural Affairs from 2014.

Müller was an SPD delegate to the Federal Convention for the purpose of electing the President of Germany in 2004, 2009 and 2012. In the negotiations to form a coalition government under the leadership of Chancellor Angela Merkel following the 2017 federal elections, he was part of the working group on urban development, led by Bernd Althusmann, Kurt Gribl and Natascha Kohnen.

Member of the German Parliament, 2021–present
In August 2020, Müller announced his intention to leave state politics and instead run as a candidate in the 2021 national elections. In the negotiations to form a so-called traffic light coalition of the SPD, the Green Party and the Free Democrats (FDP) on the national level following the elections, he was part of his party's delegation in the working group on innovation and research, co-chaired by Thomas Losse-Müller, Katharina Fegebank and Lydia Hüskens.

In parliament, Müller has been serving on the Committee on Foreign Affairs (since 2021) and its Subcommittee on Foreign Cultural and Educational Policy (since 2022). He has also been chairing a study commission set up to investigate the entire period of German involvement in Afghanistan from 2001 to 2021 and to draw lessons for  foreign and security policy in future.

In addition to his committee assignments, Müller chairs the German-Japanese Parliamentary Friendship Group.

Other activities

Corporate boards
 Flughafen Berlin Brandenburg GmbH, chairman of the supervisory board

Non-profit organizations
 Tarabya Cultural Academy, Member of the Advisory Board (since 2022)
 Friends of the Fraekelufer Synagogue, member of the board of trustees (since 2018)
 Business Forum of the Social Democratic Party of Germany, member of the political advisory board (since 2018)
 Ernst Reuter Foundation for Advanced Study, ex-officio chair of the board of trustees
 Free University of Berlin, member of the board of trustees
 Natural History Museum, Berlin, member of the board of trustees
 Technical University of Berlin, member of the board of trustees (2018–2019)
 Stiftung Preußische Seehandlung, ex-officio chairman of the board of trustees (–2021)
 Topography of Terror Foundation, chairman
 Development and Peace Foundation (SEF), deputy chairman of the board of trustees
 Association of German Cities, ex-officio member of the Presidium
 American Academy in Berlin, honorary trustee
 Aspen Institute Berlin, member of the board of trustees
 Cultural Foundation of the German States (KdL), ex-officio member of the council
 Deutsche Klassenlotterie Berlin (DKB), member of the board of trustees (–2021)
 Deutsches Museum, member of the board of trustees (–2021)
 Council for Christian-Jewish Cooperation in Berlin, member of the board of trustees (–2021)
 Literarisches Colloquium Berlin, member of the board of trustees (–2021)

References

External links 

 CV on the website of Berlin

1964 births
Living people
Presidents of the German Bundesrat
Social Democratic Party of Germany politicians
Mayors of Berlin
Senators of Berlin
21st-century German politicians
Members of the Abgeordnetenhaus of Berlin
People from Tempelhof-Schöneberg
Members of the Bundestag 2021–2025